Alice of Jerusalem may refer to:

Alice of Antioch, daughter of Baldwin II of Jerusalem and wife of Bohemund II of Antioch
Alice of Cyprus (1196–1246), daughter of Henry II of Champagne and wife of Hugh I of Cyprus and then Bohemund V of Antioch